NIP or nip may refer to:

Acronyms
 Dubai National Industries Park, a technology park in Dubai, UAE
 National Immunization Program, a part of the Centers for Disease Control and Prevention
 Numer Identyfikacji Podatkowej, tax identification number in Poland
 National Independence Party (UK), minor far-right political party in 1970s UK
 National Infrastructure Pipeline, a group of social and economic infrastructure projects in India
 National Institute of Physics, at the University of the Philippines Diliman
 Ninjas in Pyjamas, a professional esports organization
 NIP (model theory), a property of theories in mathematical logic
 Northern Independence Party, minor political party seeking independence for the north of England 
 Northern Ireland Protocol
 Notice of Intended Prosecution, for criminal prosecution in the United Kingdom
 Nude in public

Others
 Nip (surname), Cantonese spelling of Nie
 Nip, a unit used in alcohol measurements
 Nip, a derogative word for Japanese people
 The Nips, punk band
 Nip, short for nipple
 Nip, synonym for pinch

See also
 Nippy
 Nip/Tuck
 NIPS (disambiguation)
 Nipper (disambiguation)